Methysticin is one of the six major kavalactones found in the kava plant. Research suggests that methysticin and the related compound dihydromethysticin have CYP1A1 inducing effects which may be responsible for their toxicity. Additionally, methysticin has been shown to potentiate GABAA receptor activity, contributing to the overall anxiolytic profile of the kava plant.

Toxicity
Methysticin induces the function of the hepatic enzyme CYP1A1.  This enzyme is involved in the toxification of benzo[a]pyrene into (+)-benzo[a]pyrene-7,8-dihydrodiol-9,10-epoxide, a highly carcinogenic substance.  Another related compound is dihydromethysticin, which also induces the function of CYP1A1. No report so far has described enhancement of CYP1A1 expression in animals or humans in vivo from any constituent of kava.

References

Ethers
Kavalactones
Benzodioxoles
Alkene derivatives
GABAA receptor positive allosteric modulators
Norepinephrine reuptake inhibitors
Calcium channel blockers
Sodium channel blockers
Monoamine oxidase inhibitors